Way of the Dragon 2, also known as Bruce Le's Greatest Revenge, is a 1978 martial arts film sequel to Way of the Dragon starring Bruce Le. The film is considered to be a Bruceploitation film. Despite the title, the film has more in common with the 1972 film Fist of Fury.

Synopsis
A young student attempts to keep peace between a European club and some Chinese students but finds himself a victim of hatred.

Cast
 Bruce Le
 Ku Feng
 Michelle Yim
 Hon Kwok Choi 
 Yen Tsan Tang
 Bolo Yeung
 Li Yi Min
 To Siu Ming
 San Kuai
 Fong Yau
 Bill Lake
 Bruce Tong

Release
The film was released in West Germany on 21 August 1980. The film was released in the Netherlands in 2008.

Reception
 
Cityonfire.com said "Cheap, but not exactly terrible". The Video Vacuum gave the film 3 out of 4 stars.

References

External links
 
 
 

1978 films
1970s martial arts films
1970s action films
Hong Kong martial arts films
Hong Kong action films
1970s Mandarin-language films
1970s Cantonese-language films
Hong Kong sequel films
Bruceploitation films
Kung fu films
1980s Hong Kong films